Henry Goren is an American photojournalist, videographer, cinematographer, and documentary film director, known in the industry for his hidden camera and investigative expertise, as well as his activism on behalf of unions, the environment, animal rights and other causes.

Goren gained international attention  as organizer of the 2012 protest movement against Petco and its Husky Camp dog adoption events and in the 1980s, when he organized Hawaii's first underwater cleanup campaigns.

Directed (with Wayne Darwen) and produced the 2014 documentary film, High There, which has become a rallying point for the movement to legalize marijuana in the United States and to free Hawaiian marijuana activist Roger Christie from federal incarceration.

Television credits

Goren has wide and varied experience in the entertainment industry.  He broke into film in the post production department of Schick Sunn Classic Pictures in 1981, and was promoted to assistant film editor before moving to the television news business as cameraman for various Los Angeles television stations.  He was later director of photography for network and syndicated television shows including Dateline, Extra, Celebrity Justice, TV's Bloopers & Practical Jokes and NBC’s Olympics coverage. Goren also did field camera work for the McNeil-Lehrer NewsHour and was director of photography for Alex Paen's series, Animal Rescue, Dog Tales and Real Green.

He was a stunt driver on Stingray, the NBC crime drama produced by Stephen J. Cannell, and appeared onscreen as a footballer on HBO's 1st and Ten and a police officer on General Hospital.

Goren is noted as an expert in setting up and operating hidden camera stings and television investigations.

Film and video work

Goren was a director of photography for Clint Eastwood's Malpaso Productions on the 1998 video release, Monterey Jazz Festival: 40 Legendary Years.

He is a member of AFTRA and IATSE 600.

Petco protest

In January 2012, Goren led the first of the nonviolent protests in Brea, California, against Petco and other corporations' involvement with Husky Camp, a nonprofit group that works to rescue and find new homes for Siberian and Malamute husky dogs. A former Husky Camp volunteer. Goren saw firsthand examples of unsafe care and conditions for the dogs.

"I don't want to see this rescue continue. I want the dogs to be taken care of in a better way," Goren was quoted at the time. "I also think Petco should do a better job selecting and reviewing animal rescue groups."

Goren mobilized many volunteers and support, including that of the Occupy movement's Occupy Orange County offshoot, at the protest. As a result, Petco discontinued its bi-weekly Husky adoption events at that location and others.  Husky Camp came under the scrutiny of a number of agencies.

High There
Goren began freelancing as a videographer for Telepictures in 2002, beginning a long collaboration with television producer Wayne Darwen that culminated in the pair directing and producing High There (which premiered 25 August 2014 at the Action on Film International Film Festival in Monrovia, California). Goren was also credited as director of photography and editor.

High There is a nonfiction comedy about the pair's efforts to film the pilot for a marijuana travelogue series on the island of Hawaii. They wind up in various misadventures, while uncovering a Drug Enforcement Administration campaign to control the marijuana trade and to persecute marijuana activist Roger Christie.

Goren caused a stir when he appeared in character, wearing his trademark gas mask as "Roland Jointz," at the opening of the 2014 Action on Film Festival.

High There won the Viewers' Choice Award at the first annual Cannabis Film Festival in Humboldt County, California on May 3, 2015.  On the heels of several rave reviews, it was released on VOD and Limited Edition DVD by BrinkVision on June 23, 2015.

High There is a Sam Peters International Productions Unlimited and Good Story Productions presentation of a Rat Lung picture.

Hawaiian years

Goren lived and worked in Oahu, Hawaii from 1984 to 1989, where he was responsible for creating and spreading the image of the 50th State as a leading cinematographer for Japanese television commercials, and stock photographer for Quadrant Pictures, UK and Stock Photos Hawaii.

He was also a SCUBA instructor and divemaster in Waikiki, Oahu, noted for filming underwater tours of popular local dive sites. He became a popular figure on local television and radio when he initiated one of Hawaii's first 'underwater' clean-up campaigns in Waikiki's Ala Wai boat harbor.

Awards

Henry Goren won a 2002 Golden Mike Award in the entertainment reporting division for the KCOP-TV-13 report, "A Star Is Born."

The following year, he was nominated for an Emmy Award for photographing the multi-part news series, "Dangerous Beauty."

"Alien Tom," a documentary short filmed and directed by Henry Goren, won the Silver Lei Award 2017 Honolulu Film Awards for director.

AREA 420 the serial episodes 1 and 2 won Gold in the Los Angeles Motion Picture Film Festival in May 2020 which Henry Goren Directed and was DoP. The serial is currently streaming via SofyTv.

References

External links
 
 Henry Goren biography
 Video: High There Directors Tell All
 Henry Goren in High There movie trailer
 High There movie website 
 "A Star Is Born," Henry Goren's Golden Mike award-winning news report

Living people
Year of birth missing (living people)
American male journalists
American film producers
American film directors